Hayley Dawn Sage (born 1 August 1986 in Welwyn Garden City, Hertfordshire) is an English diver, who specialized in individual and synchronized springboard events. She won the bronze medal, along with her partner Tandi Gerrard, in the women's 3 m synchronised springboard event at the 2006 Commonwealth Games in Melbourne, Australia. Hayley represented Great Britain 32 times at international events, also achieving 10 Great Britain National titles and 26 County Championship titles representing Hertfordshire.

Sage made her official debut for the 2008 Summer Olympics in Beijing, where she competed in the women's 3 m synchronised springboard event. She and her partner Gerrard finished eighth in the final.

References

External links
NBC 2008 Olympics profile
Team GB Profile

English female divers
Living people
Olympic divers of Great Britain
Divers at the 2006 Commonwealth Games
Divers at the 2008 Summer Olympics
Sportspeople from Welwyn Garden City
1986 births
Commonwealth Games bronze medallists for England
Commonwealth Games medallists in diving
Medallists at the 2006 Commonwealth Games